Žaklina Litauniece (born 20 November 1968 in Rēzekne) is a Latvian female curler and yachtswoman.

As a curler, at the national level, she is a two-time Latvian women's champion (2013, 2014).

As a sailor, she competed at the 2000 Summer Olympics in the "Europe" class (women's one person dinghy) races, finished in 27th place.

Teams

Women's

Mixed

References

External links
 
 
 
 
 
 Video: 

Living people
1968 births
People from Rēzekne
Latvian female curlers
Latvian curling champions
Latvian female sailors (sport)
Olympic sailors of Latvia
Sailors at the 2000 Summer Olympics – Europe